Mint Spring is an unincorporated community in Augusta County, Virginia, United States.

Chapel Hill was listed on the National Register of Historic Places in 1978.

References

Unincorporated communities in Augusta County, Virginia
Unincorporated communities in Virginia